Oberführer and Oberst of Police Wilhelm Fuchs (1 September 1898, in Mannheim – 24 January 1947, in Belgrade) was a Nazi Einsatzkommando leader. From April 1941 to January 1942 he commanded Einsatzgruppe Serbia. From 15 September 1943 through 27 May 1944 he commanded Einsatzkommando 3. He was executed by hanging in Belgrade.

Fuchs studied at the University of Leipzig Agricultural Science and received his doctorate in 1929, On 1 April 1932, he joined the NSDAP (member NR. 1,038,061). On 1 December 1932, he became SS (member NR. 62 760). On 11 July 1933, he was appointed Untersturmführer and, on 20 April 1938, promoted to Standartenführer.

References

Serbia under German occupation
Einsatzgruppen personnel
Holocaust perpetrators in Yugoslavia
1898 births
1947 deaths
SS-Oberführer
Nazis executed by Yugoslavia by hanging
SS and Police Leaders
Military personnel from Mannheim
Executed people from Baden-Württemberg
People from the Grand Duchy of Baden
20th-century Freikorps personnel

Executed mass murderers